Mother Pluto is a Silly Symphonies cartoon released on November 14, 1936, directed by David Hand. The cartoon features Pluto.

Plot
The cartoon starts out in a farmyard with a hen in Pluto's doghouse. She notices a butterfly and goes after it, after hiding all of the eggs under the hay in Pluto's doghouse so that no one will steal them. Once she leaves, Pluto returns and gnaws a bone to his doghouse. 
He feels something underneath him and hears some noise. That's when a chick hatched and Pluto is very surprised. All of the other chicks hatch and follow Pluto outside. He tries to escape by going over the fence but the chicks go through the fence holes to follow him. 
The chicks play with Pluto until they get distracted by a grasshopper and Pluto takes advantage of this to get away from the chick but
when he notices one of the chicks upset after swallowing the grasshopper he comforts it and starts to enjoy being a mother. The hen comes back into Pluto's doghouse only to notice that her chicks have hatched and are gone. After finding them with Pluto she and Pluto  argue over the chicks. The hen goes to a rooster to help her get back her chicks. The rooster, and Pluto fight as the chicks go in his doghouse. Pluto tired after the battle returns to his doghouse. He reminisces about his time with the chicks until they appear.
Pluto embraces them and they live happily ever after.

Voices
 Pluto: Pinto Colvig
 The hen: Florence Gill

Comic adaptations
The Silly Symphony Sunday comic strip ran a two-month-long adaptation of Mother Pluto from August 14 to October 16, 1938.

Home media
The short was released on December 4, 2001 on Walt Disney Treasures: Silly Symphonies - The Historic Musical Animated Classics.

References

External links 
 
 Mother Pluto at the Encyclopedia of Disney Animated Shorts
 

1936 films
1936 short films
1936 comedy films
1936 animated films
1930s American animated films
1930s English-language films
1930s Disney animated short films
American animated short films
American black-and-white films
Silly Symphonies
Pluto (Disney) short films
Animated films about chickens
Animated films about friendship
Animated films set in the United States
Films set on farms
Films set in 1936
Animated films without speech
Films directed by David Hand
Films produced by Walt Disney
Films scored by Leigh Harline